is a railway station on the Tokyu Meguro Line in Shinagawa, Tokyo, Japan, operated by the private railway operator Tokyu Corporation.

Lines

Station layout
This station has two island platforms serving four tracks. Local trains typically use tracks 1 and 4, while express trains use tracks 2 and 3.

Platforms

History
The station opened on 11 March 1923, initially named simply . It was renamed Musashi-Koyama in June 1924.

The station was rebuilt as an underground station, reopening on 2 July 2006.

Passenger statistics

Surrounding area
 Hoshi University

See also
 List of railway stations in Japan

References

External links

  .

Tokyu Meguro Line
Railway stations in Tokyo
Railway stations in Japan opened in 1923